Chhundo (Gujarati:  છૂંદો, Hindi:  छुन्दो)  is a kind of Indian pickle preparation as well as a condiment mostly made out of grated green mangoes, used in cuisine of the Indian subcontinent as an accompaniment to the main meal that consists of Roti, Sabzi and other food items. However, it is a generic form of preparation that can be made with various fruits and vegetables. Chhundo is particularly a Kathiawadi dish but is consumed across Gujarat.

Since mango is a seasonal fruit and is available in abundance only in summer in India (April–July), most mango pickles are made during this time with oil or sugar base and then preserved in large glass containers. This way Chhundo and other pickles are available for consumption throughout the year.

Etymology
Chhundo, literally translated in Gujarati means crushed.
Although sources of its origin are unknown, along with other popular Indian pickles, Chhundo and Murabbo, two types of mango relishes are commonly consumed in daily Gujarati meals.

History
Chhundo is believed to have originated in the Kathiawar region of Gujarat.

Preparation and variations

As mentioned earlier, although the most popular variety of Chhundo is the one prepared with grated mangoes, other variations such as pineapple Chhundo.

Nutrition
Since it is prepared and preserved in sugar syrup, its main energy component is sugar. It also provides Vitamin C and Vitamin A.

See also

References

External links

 Spiced chhundo recipe and information at sbs.com.au

Indian condiments
Indian pickles
Gujarati cuisine